Kulab is a city in the Khatlon Region of Tajikistan. 

Kulab in Iran may refer to:
Kulab-e Fartaq, a village in Kohgiluyeh and Boyer-Ahmad Province, Iran
Kulab, Razavi Khorasan, a village in Razavi Khorasan Province, Iran
Kulab, Isfahan, a village in Isfahan Province, Iran